The Province of Caltanissetta (or ; officially Libero consorzio comunale di Caltanissetta) is a province in the southern part of Sicily, Italy. Following the suppression of the Sicilian provinces, it was replaced in 2015 by the Free municipal consortium of Caltanissetta. It contains 22 comuni, which are listed at Comuni of the Province of Caltanissetta. Its coat of arms is a red crest and two green leaf stems on top with a laurel leaf on the right and a crown in the middle.

Bordering provinces and metropolitan cities 
In counterclockwise order:
 Province of Agrigento, west
 Metropolitan City of Palermo, north-west
 Province of Enna, north
 Metropolitan City of Catania, north-east
 Province of Ragusa, east

Geography 
The province extends to the central part of Sicily in the northwestern direction where the capital is located. The commune of Resuttano is found in an enclave of the province of Palermo near Caltanissetta between Monte Stretto and Portella del Vento. The land extends to the Gela Plain and into the Gulf of Gela, where the main river of the province, the Salso, meets the Mediterranean.

Population 
The total population of the province is 271.758 people. Here below are listed the communes with more than 10,000 inhabitants:
 Gela (74,075 inhabitants)
 Caltanissetta (61,311 inhabitants)
 Niscemi (26,274 inhabitants)
 San Cataldo (21,859 inhabitants)
 Mazzarino (11,445 inhabitants)
 Riesi (11,110 inhabitants)
 Mussomeli (10,262 inhabitants)

See also 
 Comuni of the Province of Caltanissetta

References

External links 

 Official website 
 Pictures, history, tourism, gastronomy, books, local products, local surnames, transportation in the province of Caltanissetta

 
Caltanissetta